Bowman Field  is a public airport  southeast of downtown Louisville, in Jefferson County, Kentucky. The FAA calls it a reliever airport for nearby Louisville Muhammad Ali International Airport.

History
Established in 1919, Bowman Field is Kentucky's first commercial airport and is the oldest continually operating commercial airfield in North America. It was founded by Abram H. Bowman, who was drawn to aviation by the interest generated during World War I.

Bowman found an outlet for his enthusiasm after meeting and forming a brief partnership with Louisvillian Robert H. Gast, a pilot and World War I veteran of the Royal Flying Corps. Bowman leased a parcel of land east of Louisville from the U.S. Government in 1919 to operate the airfield, which opened in 1921.

The first business ventures began with the aerial photography business in 1921, and the 465th Pursuit Squadron (Reserve) began operations at Bowman Field in 1922.

Charles Lindbergh landed the Spirit of St. Louis at the airport in 1927, viewed by 10,000 spectators.

During the Great Depression, Louisvillians would often come to the Art Deco terminal building to watch airplanes depart and land as a form of inexpensive entertainment.

During the 1930s Eastern Air Lines and Trans World Airlines (TWA) carried passengers and mail in and out of Bowman Field; in 1947 the airlines moved to Standiford Field.

During World War II Bowman Field was one of the nation's most important training bases and the nation's busiest airport. The facility became known as "Air Base City" when a bomber squadron moved in and more than 1,600 recruits underwent basic training in a three-month period. The United States Army Air Forces' school for flight surgeons, medical technicians, and flight nurses also called Bowman Field home.

Bowman Field was used in the James Bond film Goldfinger as the base for Pussy Galore's Flying Circus; principal photography of hangars, aircraft, etc., were done there in fall of 1963.

Historic buildings

In 1988, three adjacent buildings at the airport were added to the National Register of Historic Places as the Bowman Field Historic District. They are the airport Administration Building (1929; 1936–37), the Curtiss Flying Service Hangar (1929), and the Army Air Corps Hangar (1931–32). Since many urban airports are located in industrial areas, this verdant setting is unusual and contributes to the ambience of the Bowman Field Historic District.

The buildings of the Bowman Field Historic District are related not only by proximity and historical function, but by their Art Deco/Art Moderne styling and use of masonry materials such as brick, stone and concrete.

The dominant landmark of Bowman Field is its terminal, known as the Administration Building, styled in aerodynamic Streamline Moderne, and designed by the firm of Wischmeyer and Arrasmith. As built in 1929, it was a fairly modest two-story structure with one-story wings, housing administrative and communications offices, weather station, and restaurant. During 1936 and 1937, it nearly tripled in size. This was accomplished by demolishing the east wing and retaining the west and central sections as west wings of the new building. The Administration Building faces an elliptical landscaped island surrounded by a driveway and paved parking area.

Current operations

Today Bowman Field is home to hundreds of privately owned aircraft as well as several commercial operations, including Central American Airways, which opened its doors in 1946, Falcon Aviation (which can trace its roots to the old Louisville Flying Service that began operations in 1932), Aero Club of Louisville, Inc., and Louisville Executive Aviation. Several flight schools operate there as well.

In the year long period ending June 20th, 2022, the airport averaged 268 aircraft operations per day: 47% local general aviation, 45% transient general aviation 7% air taxi and <1% military.  235 aircraft are based at this airport: 195 single-engine, 29 multi-engine, 6 jet, and 5 helicopter.

Bowman Field is operated by the Louisville Regional Airport Authority, which also operates Louisville Muhammad Ali International Airport.

See also
 History of Louisville, Kentucky
 Kentucky World War II Army Airfields
 I Troop Carrier Command
 Transportation in Louisville, Kentucky
 National Register of Historic Places listings in Jefferson County, Kentucky

References

External links

Louisville Art Deco page on Bowman Field
Aviation: From Sand Dunes to Sonic Booms, a National Park Service Discover Our Shared Heritage Travel Itinerary

1921 establishments in Kentucky
Airports in Kentucky
Airports established in 1921
Art Deco airports
Art Deco architecture in Kentucky
Transportation buildings and structures in Louisville, Kentucky
National Register of Historic Places in Louisville, Kentucky
Airfields of the United States Army Air Forces in Kentucky
Airfields of the United States Army Air Corps
Airfields of the United States Army Air Forces I Troop Carrier Command
Historic districts on the National Register of Historic Places in Kentucky
Airports on the National Register of Historic Places
Transportation buildings and structures on the National Register of Historic Places in Kentucky